Sadist is a death metal band from Genoa, Italy, founded in January 1991. They made their debut with a Black Screams EP in 1991, followed by three albums. The band went on a hiatus after releasing the album Lego in 2000. They reunited in 2005 and released their self-titled album in 2007, followed by the release of further three albums since then. In total, the band has released nine albums and one EP. They are currently signed to Scarlet Records. Guitarist and keyboardist Tommy Talamanca has been a constant feature throughout the band's existence, as the main composer and co-producer of their musical output. Trevor Nadir has been the main vocalist of the band since 1996.

History

1991-2000 
Sadist was formed in early 1991 by Tommy Talamanca (guitar, keyboards) and Marco 'Peso' Pesenti (drums), who had left the band Necrodeath to start a new project. Inspired by progressive rock and thrash metal, Talamanca developed the musical concept for the group, while Andy Marchini (bass) and Fabio Bocchiddi (vocals) joined. While playing locally, the band recorded a short demo and were signed by the indie label Obscure Plasma Records. They released the Black Screams EP in September 1991 which took the material from the demo tape. The EP was later released in 1992 by American indie label Wild Rag Records as a three-track version. The band toured Italy and France, until Bocchiddi left the band a year later and Marchini took over the vocal duties.

The band signed a record deal with Nosferatu Records for a two-album contract and released Above the Light in 1993. Marchini left the band and was replaced by bassist Chicco Parisi and a new singer, Zanna. In late 1993, the band recorded a video for the song "Sometimes They Come Back" from the Above the Light album and toured France and the Netherlands.

In early 1994, Sadist supported Carcass during the Italian shows for their "Heartwork" tour; a few months later they supported Samael in France. While on tour, the band worked on songs for their new album and in May 1995 entered Rhythm Studios in Bidford on Avon, England, where they started recording their second album.

In 1996, Tribe was released in February, distributed by Sun Rising Records for Europe and Toy's Factory for Japan. The band toured to promote the new album in France, Italy, and the Netherlands until June and their second video, "Tribe," was broadcast all over Europe. In November, Sadist headlined Mindviews Belgian Metal Convention, and later were featured on the Japanese Iron Maiden tribute with their version of "Wrathchild." At the end of 1996, drummer Pesenti left reform Necrodeath. He was replaced by Filippo 'Oinos' Ferrari. Singer Zanna was replaced by Trevor Nadir, while bass player Andy Marchini returned.

In early 1997, the band started recording sessions for their third album. Before the album was released Oinos left the band and was replaced by Alessio Spallarossa. At the end of 1997, Sadist signed with label Displeased Records and released Crust that same year. The album was also distributed in Japan. In 1998, the band released their third music video, "'Fools' and Dolts." Shortly afterwards, the band travelled to Germany to play at European festival Wacken Open Air.

In 1999, the band signed with Impact/System Shock and produced the new album Lego by themselves at Nadir Recording Studios. The response to the album was not as favourable as to previous albums, and the band went on hiatus. They reformed in 2005 and signed with Italian indie label Beyond Productions. A video for the song 'One Thousand Memories' appeared in February 2008. They re-released Above the Light and Tribe both remastered at Talamanca's Nadir Studios.

2005—present 
In late 2006, the band began recording sessions for a new album. The self-titled album Sadist was released in April 2007 and featured a guest appearance by Claudio Simonetti from Goblin on the title track. The band toured the rest of the year, headlining two Armenian festivals, Highland Metalfest and Rock the Borders. In 2010, the band released the album Season in Silence - the first on the Italian Scarlet label. 

In 2015 the band released the album Hyaena inspired by African rhythms and featured the Senegalese percussionist Jean N'Diaye.  

In November 2018, the album Spellbound was released, inspired by the films of Alfred Hitchcock, where the songs referred to characters or earlier movies such as The Mountain Eagle. In 2019, the original bass-player Andy Marchini left the band while Andrea Nasso filled in on tour. At the start of 2021, the band announced that the recording on a ninth album Firescorched had begun, with Jeroen Paul Thesseling on fretless bass, and Romain Goulon on drums. The album was released on May 20, 2022.

Discography

Studio albums 
 Above the Light (1993)
 Tribe (1996)
 Crust (1997)
 Lego (2000)
 Sadist (2007)
 Season in Silence (2010)
 Hyaena (2015)
 Spellbound (2018)
 Firescorched (2022)

EP
 Black Screams (1991) (EP)

Videography
 "Sometimes They Come Back" – Above the Light (1993)
 "Tribe" – Tribe (1996)
 "'Fools' and Dolts" – Crust (1998)
 "Tearing Away" – Sadist (2007)
 "One Thousand Memories" – Sadist (2007)
 "The Lonely Mountain" – Hyaena (2015)
 "Den Siste Kamp" Ft. GnuQuartet (2017)
 "Accabadora" – Firescorched (2022)

Band line-up

Current members 
 Tommy Talamanca − guitars, keyboards (1991–2001, 2005–present)
 Trevor Nadir − vocals (1996–2000, 2005–present)
 Romain Goulon − drums (2020–present)

Former members
 Andy Marchini − bass guitar, vocals (1991–1994); fretless bass (1996–2001, 2005–2019)
 Marco "Peso" Pesenti − drums (1991–1996) 
 Sibylle Colin-Tocquaine − vocals (1991) 
 Fabio − vocals (1991–1992, 2000–2001) 
 Zanna − vocals (1995–1996) 
 Chicco Parisi − bass, fretless bass (1995–1996)
 Oinos − drums (1997–1999)
 Alessio Spallarossa − drums (1999–2001, 2005–2020)
 Andrea Nasso − bass guitar (2019–2020)

Timeline

References

External links
 .
 Sadist official site

Italian death metal musical groups
Musical groups established in 1991
Musical quartets
Musical groups disestablished in 2000
Musical groups reestablished in 2005
1991 establishments in Italy
Season of Mist artists
Scarlet Records artists